In Greek mythology, Daedalus (Greek: Δαίδαλος; Latin: Daedalus; Etruscan: Taitale) was a skillful architect and craftsman, seen as a symbol of wisdom, knowledge and power. He is the father of Icarus, the uncle of Perdix, and possibly also the father of Iapyx. Among his most famous creations are the wooden cow for Pasiphaë, the Labyrinth for King Minos of Crete which imprisoned the Minotaur, and wings that he and his son Icarus used to escape Crete. It was during this escape that Icarus did not heed his father's warnings and flew too close to the sun; the wax holding his wings together melted and Icarus fell to his death.

Epigraphic evidence
The name Daidalos seems to be attested in Linear B, a writing system used to record Mycenaean Greek. The name appears in the form da-da-re-jo-de, possibly referring to a sanctuary.

Family
Daedalus's parentage was supplied as a later addition, with various authors attributing different parents to him. His father is claimed to be either Eupalamus, Metion, or Palamaon. Similarly, his mother was either Alcippe, Iphinoe, Phrasmede or Merope, daughter of King Erechtheus. Daedalus had two sons: Icarus and Iapyx, along with a nephew named either Talos, Calos, or Perdix.

The Athenians made Cretan-born Daedalus Athenian-born, the grandson of the ancient king Erechtheus, claiming that Daedalus fled to Crete after killing his nephew.

Inventor, architect, artist 
Daedalus is first mentioned in roughly 1400 BC on the Knossian Linear B tablets.  He is later mentioned by Homer as the creator of a dancing floor for Ariadne, similar to that which Hephaestus placed on the Shield of Achilles. It is clear that Daedalus was not an original character of Homer's. Rather, Homer was referencing mythology that his audience was already familiar with.

Daedalus is not mentioned again in literature until the fifth century BC, but he is widely praised as an inventor, artist, and architect, though classical sources disagree on which inventions exactly are attributable to him. In Pliny's Natural History (7.198) he is credited with inventing carpentry, including tools like the axe, saw, glue, and more. Supposedly, he first invented masts and sails for ships for the navy of King Minos. He is also said to have carved statues so spirited they appeared to be living and moving. Pausanias, in traveling around Greece, attributed to Daedalus numerous archaic wooden cult figures (see xoana) that impressed him. In fact, so many other statues and artworks are attributed to Daedalus by Pausanias and various other sources that likely many of them were never made by him.

Daedalus gave his name, eponymously, to many Greek craftsmen and many Greek contraptions and inventions that represented dextrous skill. A specific sort of early Greek sculptures are named Daedalic sculpture in his honor. In Boeotia there was a festival, the Daedala, in which a temporary wooden altar was fashioned and an effigy was made from an oak-tree and dressed in bridal attire. It was carried in a cart with a woman who acted as bridesmaid. The image was called daedala. Some sources claim that the daedala did not receive their name from Daedalus, but the opposite. Pausanias claims that Daedalus was not the name given to the inventor at birth, but that he was named so later after the daedala.

Mythology

Nephew 

Daedalus was so proud of his achievements that he could not bear the idea of a rival. His sister had placed her son under his charge to be taught the mechanical arts as an apprentice. His nephew is named variously as Perdix, Talos, or Calos, although some sources say that Perdix was the name of Daedalus' sister. The nephew showed striking evidence of ingenuity. Finding the spine of a fish on the seashore, he took a piece of iron and notched it on the edge, and thus invented the saw. He put two pieces of iron together, connecting them at one end with a rivet, and sharpening the other ends, and made a pair of compasses. Daedalus was so envious of his nephew's accomplishments that he attempted to murder him by throwing him down from the Acropolis in Athens. Athena saved his nephew and turned him into a partridge. Tried and convicted for this murder attempt, Daedalus left Athens and fled to Crete.

The Labyrinth
Daedalus created the Labyrinth on Crete, in which the Minotaur was kept. 

Poseidon had given a white bull to King Minos to use it as a sacrifice. Instead, the king kept the bull for himself and sacrificed another. As revenge, Poseidon, with the help of Aphrodite, made King Minos's wife, Pasiphaë, lust for the bull. Pasiphaë asked Daedalus to help her. Daedalus built a hollow, wooden cow, covered in real cow hide for Pasiphaë, so she could mate with the bull. As a result, Pasiphaë gave birth to the Minotaur, a creature with the body of a man, but the head an tail of a bull. King Minos ordered the Minotaur to be imprisoned and guarded in the Labyrinth built by Daedalus for that purpose.

In the story of the Labyrinth as told by the Hellenes, the Athenian hero Theseus is challenged to kill the Minotaur, finding his way back out with the help of Ariadne's thread. It is Daedalus himself who gives Ariadne the clue as to how to escape the labyrinth.

Ignoring Homer, later writers envisaged the Labyrinth as an edifice rather than a single dancing path to the center and out again, and gave it numerous winding passages and turns that opened into one another, seeming to have neither beginning nor end. Ovid, in his Metamorphoses, suggests that Daedalus constructed the Labyrinth so cunningly that he himself could barely escape it after he built it.

Icarus

The most familiar literary telling explaining Daedalus' wings is a late one by Ovid in his Metamorphoses.After Theseus and Ariadne eloped together, Daedalus and his son Icarus were imprisoned by King Minos in the labyrinth that he had built. He could not leave Crete by sea, as King Minos kept a strict watch on all vessels, permitting none to sail without being carefully searched. Since Minos controlled the land routes as well, Daedalus set to work to make wings for himself and his son Icarus. Using bird feathers of various sizes, thread, and beeswax, he shaped them to resemble a bird's wings. When both were prepared for flight, Daedalus warned Icarus not to fly too high, because the heat of the sun would melt the beeswax (holding his feathers together) and the wings would break, nor too low, because the sea foam would soak the feathers and make them heavy and he would fall. After Daedalus and Icarus had passed Samos, Delos, and Lebynthos, Icarus disobeyed his father and began to soar upward toward the sun. He flew too close to the sun. Without any warning, the sun melted the wax that held the feathers together and they fell off. Icarus kept flapping his "wings". But he realized he had no feathers left and he was only flapping his featherless arms. The feathers (one by one) fell like snowflakes, and down, down, and down he went into the sea (where he sank to the bottom and drowned). Seeing Icarus' wings floating in the sea, Daedalus wept, cursed his art, and (finding Icarus's dead body on an island shore) buried Icarus's body there. Then he named the island Icaria in the memory of his child. The southeast end of the Aegean Sea where Icarus fell into the water was also called "Mare Icarium" or the Icarian Sea. In a twist of fate, a partridge, presumably the nephew Daedalus murdered, mocked Daedalus as he buried his son. The fall and death of Icarus is seemingly portrayed as punishment for Daedalus's murder of his nephew.

The shell riddle 
After burying Icarus, Daedalus traveled to Camicus in Sicily, where he stayed as a guest under the protection of King Cocalus. There Daedalus built a temple to Apollo, and hung up his wings as an offering to the god. In an invention of Virgil (Aeneid VI), Daedalus flies to Cumae and founds his temple there, rather than in Sicily.

Minos, meanwhile, searched for Daedalus by traveling from city to city asking a riddle. He presented a spiral seashell and asked for a string to be run through it. When he reached Camicus, King Cocalus, knowing Daedalus would be able to solve the riddle, accepted the shell and gave it to Daedalus. Daedalus tied the string to an ant which, lured by a drop of honey at one end, walked through the seashell stringing it all the way through. With the riddle solved, Minos realized that Daedalus was in the court of King Cocalus and insisted he be handed over. Cocalus agreed to do so, but convinced Minos to take a bath first. In the bath, Cocalus' daughters killed Minos, possibly by pouring boiling water over his body. In some versions, it's Cocalus that kills Minos in the bath. Other variants say that Daedalus himself poured the boiling water, or that he had built the pipes that could supply hot water to the bath and this was used to instead pour boiling water on him.

Death 
At least two locations are associated with the death of Daedalus. One version of the story says he retired to the Cretan colony of Telmessos, ruled by Minos's estranged brother Sarpedon, and while wandering outside the city, he was bitten by a snake and died. A town on this site, Daidala, is said to be named after him, and is mentioned in Roman sources. Another version of the story places his death on a small island in the Nile river, where he was later worshipped.

The anecdotes are literary and late. However, in the founding tales of the Greek colony of Gela, founded in the 680s BC on the southwest coast of Sicily, a tradition was preserved that the Greeks had seized cult images wrought by Daedalus from their local predecessors, the Sicani.

Later depictions in art and literature 
Daedalus and the myths associated with him are often depicted in paintings, sculptures, and more by later artists. The myth about his flight and the fall of Icarus is especially popular in depictions. A few noteworthy pieces are included below.

There are also a number of adaptations of the myth of Daedalus and Icarus in modern literature and film, including a poem by Edward Field, several books, and band or musician names. See Daedalus (disambiguation) for more modern references.

Notes

References

 Apollodorus, The Library with an English Translation by Sir James George Frazer, F.B.A., F.R.S. in 2 Volumes, Cambridge, MA, Harvard University Press; London, William Heinemann Ltd. 1921. . Online version at the Perseus Digital Library. Greek text available from the same website.
 Diodorus Siculus, The Library of History translated by Charles Henry Oldfather. Twelve volumes. Loeb Classical Library. Cambridge, Massachusetts: Harvard University Press; London: William Heinemann, Ltd. 1989. Vol. 3. Books 4.59–8. Online version at Bill Thayer's Web Site
 Diodorus Siculus, Bibliotheca Historica. Vol 1-2. Immanel Bekker. Ludwig Dindorf. Friedrich Vogel. in aedibus B. G. Teubneri. Leipzig. 1888-1890. Greek text available at the Perseus Digital Library.
 Gaius Julius Hyginus, Fabulae from The Myths of Hyginus translated and edited by Mary Grant. University of Kansas Publications in Humanistic Studies. Online version at the Topos Text Project.
 Maurus Servius Honoratus, In Vergilii carmina comentarii. Servii Grammatici qui feruntur in Vergilii carmina commentarii; recensuerunt Georgius Thilo et Hermannus Hagen. Georgius Thilo. Leipzig. B. G. Teubner. 1881. Online version at the Perseus Digital Library.
 Pausanias, Description of Greece with an English Translation by W.H.S. Jones, Litt.D., and H.A. Ormerod, M.A., in 4 Volumes. Cambridge, MA, Harvard University Press; London, William Heinemann Ltd. 1918. . Online version at the Perseus Digital Library
 Pausanias, Graeciae Descriptio. 3 vols. Leipzig, Teubner. 1903.  Greek text available at the Perseus Digital Library.
 Ovid, Metamorphoses, Brookes More, Boston, Cornhill Publishing Co. 1922. Online version at the Perseus Digital Library.
 Suida, Suda Encyclopedia translated by Ross Scaife, David Whitehead, William Hutton, Catharine Roth, Jennifer Benedict, Gregory Hays, Malcolm Heath Sean M. Redmond, Nicholas Fincher, Patrick Rourke, Elizabeth Vandiver, Raphael Finkel, Frederick Williams, Carl Widstrand, Robert Dyer, Joseph L. Rife, Oliver Phillips and many others. Online version at the Topos Text Project.
 Tzetzes, John, Book of Histories, Book I translated by Ana Untila from the original Greek of T. Kiessling's edition of 1826. Online version at theio.com

External links

 Thomas Bulfinch's Mythology
 "Daedalus" at the Encyclopædia Britannica
 Andrew Stewart, One Hundred Greek Sculptors: Their Careers and Extant Works. Begins with Daedalus.
 Peter Hunt, "Ekphrasis or Not? Ovid (Met. 8.183-235 ) in Pieter Bruegel the Elder's Landscape with the Fall of Icarus". Archived from the original 10 July 2009.
 Smith, William; Dictionary of Greek and Roman Biography and Mythology, London (1873). "Daedalus"
 Warburg Institute Iconographic Database  (c. 100 photos of Daedalus and Icarus)

Ancient Greek architects
Metamorphoses characters
Attican characters in Greek mythology
Fictional architects
Cretan mythology
Legendary flying machines
Artificial wings